Abel Morán Puente (born 29 January 1930), commonly known as Pontoni, is an Argentine retired footballer who played as a defender, and is a former manager.

Playing career
Born in Fortín Olavarría, Rivadavia, Pontoni moved to Spain at the age of two. He began his senior career at SRD Esteiro, and appeared for a number of clubs in Galicia.

In 1956, aged already 26, Pontoni joined Real Valladolid in La Liga. He made his debut in the competition on 16 September 1956, playing the full 90 minutes of a 2–1 home win against FC Barcelona.

Pontoni appeared in 11 matches in the 1957–58 campaign, as his side suffered relegation. On 30 November 1958 he scored his first professional goal, netting the last in a 3–1 away win against Racing de Ferrol in the Segunda División.

Pontoni left the Blanquivioletas in 1960, with his side suffering another top level relegation. He subsequently represented CD Atlético Baleares and Granada CF in the second division, before retiring with AD Adra in 1967.

Managerial career
After his retirement Pontoni was appointed manager of Unión Estepona CF in 1969. Two years later he was appointed at the helm of CD Lugo, but his reign only lasted one season.

Subsequently, Pontoni managed clubs in his native Galicia, notably coaching Club Lemos, RC Villalbés and SDC Galicia Mugardos.

References

External links
 
 Historia Racinguista profile 

1930 births
Living people
Argentine footballers
Spanish footballers
Association football defenders
La Liga players
Segunda División players
Tercera División players
Real Valladolid players
CD Atlético Baleares footballers
Granada CF footballers
Spanish football managers
CD Lugo managers